Peter James Adam  (born 1946) is an Australian Christian minister. An Anglican priest, he served as vicar of St Jude's Church in Carlton, Melbourne, for 20 years, where he is now vicar emeritus; and principal of Ridley College (Melbourne) for ten years.

Adam has degrees from King's College London and Durham University. He has served at St George the Martyr Holborn and Durham Cathedral and is a canon of St Paul's Cathedral, Melbourne. He was also previously a lecturer at St John's College, Durham.

Adam is the vice president of the Australian Fellowship of Evangelical Students. He has written a number of books, including Speaking God's Words: A Practical Theology of Preaching, which is used as a text in many seminaries. In 2011, a Festschrift was published in his honour - Serving God's Words: Windows on preaching and ministry, which included contributions from Don Carson, Gerald Bray, Peter Jensen, Vaughan Roberts, David Jackman and Michael Raiter.

Adam was awarded the Medal of the Order of Australia in the 2012 Queen's Birthday Honours for services to theological education and to the Anglican Church of Australia.

References

Australian Anglican priests
Evangelical Anglican clergy
Seminary presidents
Recipients of the Medal of the Order of Australia
1946 births
Living people
Alumni of King's College London
Alumni of Durham University
Academics of Durham University